Route 41 is a highway in central Missouri.  Its northern terminus is at U.S. Route 24 in southern Carroll County; its southern terminus is at Interstate 70/U.S. Route 40 west of Boonville, where the road continues south as Route 135.

Route 41 is one of the original state highways.  Its original northern terminus was at the Missouri River and its southern terminus was in Marshall.  The route east of Marshall was originally Route 20.

Major intersections

References

041
Transportation in Carroll County, Missouri
Transportation in Saline County, Missouri
Transportation in Cooper County, Missouri